Bechar Bhadani is a dissident Bharatiya Janata Party MLA from Gujarat who was a former member of the cabinet of Keshubhai Patel. He is a fierce critic of current Gujarat Chief Minister Narendra Modi.

External links
BJP MLA hits out against Modi Times of India - June 14, 2007

Gujarati people
Living people
Bharatiya Janata Party politicians from Gujarat
Year of birth missing (living people)
Gujarat MLAs 1995–1998
Gujarat MLAs 1998–2002
Gujarat MLAs 2002–2007